Erich Mauff (born 18 March 1967) is a South African rower. He competed in the men's eight event at the 1992 Summer Olympics.

References

External links
 

1967 births
Living people
South African male rowers
Olympic rowers of South Africa
Rowers at the 1992 Summer Olympics
Place of birth missing (living people)